Cate Shortland (born 10 August 1968) is an Australian screenwriter, film director, television director, and television writer. She received international acclaim for her 2004 romantic drama film Somersault, her 2012 historical drama film Lore, and her 2017 psychological thriller film Berlin Syndrome. She is best known for directing the 2021 superhero film Black Widow.

Early life
Shortland was born in Temora, New South Wales. She graduated from the Australian Film, Television and Radio School, where she received the Southern Star Award for most promising student.

Career
Shortland has created several award-winning short films: Strap on Olympia (1995); Pentuphouse (1998); Flower Girl (2000); and Joy (2000).

She spent three years directing episodes of the Network Ten television series, The Secret Life of Us.

In 2004, Shortland released her debut feature-length film, Somersault (2004), which was entered in the Un Certain Regard section at the 2004 Cannes Film Festival. She directed the Australian television film The Silence.

Her second feature, Lore, had its Australian premiere at the 2012 Sydney Film Festival. It won at the Locarno International Film Festival in August 2012 the Prix du Public UBS. In November, the film won the Bronze Horse for best film at the Stockholm International Film Festival. The film was selected as the Australian entry for the Best Foreign Language Oscar at the 85th Academy Awards, but it did not make the final shortlist.

In 2015, Shortland announced she was working on a third feature film, Berlin Syndrome. Based on the book of the same name by Melanie Joosten, the film starred Teresa Palmer as an Australian photojournalist who becomes imprisoned in the apartment of a man with whom she has a one-night stand. The film premiered at the 2017 Sundance Film Festival.

In July 2018, Shortland was announced as the director of the 2021 Black Widow  film for Marvel Studios.

Personal life
Shortland is a convert to Judaism. She married filmmaker Tony Krawitz in 2009, and they have two adopted children.

Filmography
Short films

Film

Television

Awards and nominations

References

External links

Cate Shortland's Agent

1968 births
Living people
Australian film directors
Australian television directors
Australian screenwriters
Converts to Judaism
Australian Jews
Australian women film directors
Australian women screenwriters
People from the Riverina
Australian women television directors